Scott Mercado (born c. 1964) was the original drummer of Sky Cries Mary and co-founder of the Seattle rock group Candlebox, a band reunited in 2006 with a "Best of" CD, live DVD (Alive in Seattle, 2007), and a latest CD called Into the Sun, released January 2008. With over 5 million CDs sold, Candlebox continues to tour and record around the United States and the world.  Mercado has also performed with Johnny Graham
(Earth, Wind & Fire), Living Colour, and most recently, Brandi Carlile.  Known for his unique blend of jazz drumming elements into rock and roll and use of the Open-handed drumming technique.  Voted best Up and Coming drummer in Modern Drummer magazine.  He currently resides in Seattle as a studio drummer and private drum instructor.

Discography

With Candlebox 
 Candlebox (1993)
 Lucy (1995)
 The Best of Candlebox (2006)
 Into The Sun (2008)
 Alive In Seattle (2008)
 Love Stories & Other Musings (2012)

Notes and references 

1964 births
20th-century American drummers
American male drummers
Living people
American rock drummers
Candlebox members